The Mandaue City School for the Arts is a Filipino art school that opened in July 1998. The teachers at the school are performers who work in their specific discipline. The school is operated by the Mandaue City government.
It only has 1 section per grade level. Despite the size of the school, pupils and students still find ways to have practices when joining competitions.

Location: Capasanan, Casili, Mandaue City.

Offered arts: ballet, piano, voice, choir, rondalla, violin, theatre, visual arts, folk dance, marching band.

High schools in Cebu
Schools in Mandaue